John Sapcote (1448–1501) was an English Member of Parliament for Huntingdonshire in 1472.

References

1448 births
1501 deaths
15th-century English people
English MPs 1472